Exhibition Centre is an MTR station on the . It serves the Hong Kong Convention and Exhibition Centre and other parts of Wan Chai North, on Hong Kong Island, Hong Kong.

The station was built as part of the Shatin to Central Link project. It topped out on 12 November 2020 and began service on 15 May 2022. This station and the East Rail portion of Admiralty are the first KCRC-owned stations that serve Hong Kong Island.  It is the first East Rail line station on Hong Kong Island for trains coming from Hung Hom.

Description
The station serves the Hong Kong Convention and Exhibition Centre, the Wan Chai Sports Ground and various nearby office towers in Wan Chai North.

It will become an interchange station between the North Island line (the extension of ) and the East Rail line, offering cross-platform interchange between the two lines. Initially, only the East Rail line platforms are open, as the North Island line is still being planned.

The station was designed by Farrells. In January 2015, the MTR Corporation awarded a contract to Leighton in a joint venture with China State Construction to construct the station and western approach tunnel. 

The station had been built on the site of the former Harbour Road Sports Centre, Wan Chai Swimming Pool, and Wan Chai Ferry Pier Bus Terminus, which were all demolished and reprovisioned elsewhere before construction began. The swimming pool and sports centre were rebuilt on the car park site immediately to the south. The Wan Chai Ferry Pier Bus Terminus, originally located where the station was to be built, was relocated to newly reclaimed land near the new Wan Chai Ferry Pier, and the station groundbreaking took place on the former bus terminus site on 20 April 2015. The transport interchange has since been rebuilt on top of Exhibition Centre station as the latter was nearing completion.

There were plans to expand the Hong Kong Convention and Exhibition Centre over the MTR station. The enabling works for this topside development were included during the station construction. Plans for topside convention facilities above the station had since been discontinued in the 2020 Policy Address, citing technical difficulties involved, uncertainties concerning the construction period and cost-effectiveness as the reasons.

Station layout

Entrances/exits 
 A1: Harbour Centre
 A2: Transport Interchange
 A3: Harbour Road Sports Centre
 B1: Great Eagle Centre
 B2: Golden Bauhinia Square
 B3: Hong Kong Convention and Exhibition Centre

Connections 
Located above the station is the Exhibition Centre Station Public Transport Interchange, which serves as the terminal point of around 20 bus routes to different parts of Hong Kong. The interchange replaced the former Wan Chai Ferry Pier Bus Terminus, which had to be temporarily relocated to a nearby site during the station's construction.

The Wan Chai Ferry Pier, which provides Star Ferry service to Tsim Sha Tsui, is located around 150m to the north of the station.

History 
Exhibition Centre station was first proposed in the 1994 Railway Development Strategy issued by the Hong Kong Government's Transport Branch as an interchange between the proposed North Island and South Island lines. In Railway Development Strategy 2000, Exhibition became an interchange between North Island line and Shatin to Central Link.

Renaming
This station was tentatively called Exhibition station, but in late 2017 was renamed to Exhibition Centre station. Its Chinese name remained the same.

Discovery of WWII bombs 
On 27 and 31 January 2018, two American-made AN-M65 bombs, believed to have been dropped during World War II and weighing about  each, were discovered by workers at the construction site. Construction was suspended for bomb disposal work. Nearly 5000 people in the surrounding area were evacuated; no injuries were reported. Each operation took nearly 24 hours for preparation and disposal. One of the bombs was stripped of explosive material and put on display inside the station.

References

 This article draws some information from the corresponding article in Chinese Wikipedia.

External link

East Rail line
MTR stations on Hong Kong Island
Railway stations opened in 2022
Sha Tin to Central Link
Tseung Kwan O line